This is a list of the German Media Control Top100 Singles Chart number-ones of 1960.

References
 Ehnert, Günter (1999). HIT BILANZ Deutsche Chart Singles 1956-1980. 
 German Singles Chart archives from 1956
 Media Control Chart archives from 1960

1960 in Germany
Germany hits
1960